This was the first edition of the tournament.

Evgeny Donskoy and Alibek Kachmazov won the title after defeating Nam Ji-sung and Song Min-kyu 6–3, 1–6, [10–7] in the final.

Seeds

Draw

References

External links
 Main draw

Nonthaburi Challenger - Doubles